James J. Ferris High School is a four-year comprehensive public high school serving students in ninth through twelfth grades from Jersey City in Hudson County, New Jersey, United States, operated as part of the Jersey City Public Schools. The school has been accredited by the Middle States Association of Colleges and Schools Commission on Elementary and Secondary Schools since 1940.

The school is named for James J. Ferris, a civil engineer and politician in Jersey City best known for supervising the construction of the Pennsylvania Railroad Harsimus Stem Embankment and the concrete foundation of the Hudson and Manhattan Railroad Powerhouse.

As of the 2021–22 school year, the school had an enrollment of 1,292 students and 100.8 classroom teachers (on an FTE basis), for a student–teacher ratio of 12.8:1. There were 737 students (57.0% of enrollment) eligible for free lunch and 44 (3.4% of students) eligible for reduced-cost lunch.

Ferris offers specialized learning centers focusing on Finance, Hospitality & Tourism, Management / Office Procedures, Marketing and International Studies. The magnet offers courses in Accounting, Economics, Banking, Financial Planning, Intro to Finance, Computers Business Applications 1&2. During their senior year, students have an opportunity to take a paid internship co-op program at Merrill Lynch, Hyatt, Pershing, Bank of Tokyo, or the Board of Education.

The school uses two buildings, the main building and the Junior Academy building. The school has 2 gyms one in each building and a swimming pool, a weight room. Ferris has a soccer field next to school which is used for activities and soccer games on grass texture.

Awards, recognition and rankings
The school was the 299th-ranked public high school in New Jersey out of 339 schools statewide in New Jersey Monthly magazine's September 2014 cover story on the state's "Top Public High Schools", using a new ranking methodology. The school had been ranked 270th in the state of 328 schools in 2012, after being ranked 320th in 2010 out of 322 schools listed. The magazine ranked the school 280th in 2008 out of 316 schools. The school was ranked 284th in the magazine's September 2006 issue, which surveyed 316 schools across the state. Schooldigger.com ranked the school 341st out of 367 public high schools statewide in its 2009-10 rankings which were based on the combined percentage of students classified as proficient or above proficient on the language arts literacy and mathematics components of the  High School Proficiency Assessment (HSPA).

Ferris high school also has a program for young girls to become involved with technology and pursue the careers associated with the field.

Athletics
The James J. Ferris High School Bulldogs compete in the Hudson County Interscholastic League, which is comprised of public and private high schools in Hudson County and operates under the supervision of the New Jersey State Interscholastic Athletic Association (NJSIAA). With 1,009 students in grades 10-12, the school was classified by the NJSIAA for the 2019–20 school year as Group III for most athletic competition purposes, which included schools with an enrollment of 761 to 1,058 students in that grade range. The football team competes in the Ivy Red division of the North Jersey Super Football Conference, which includes 112 schools competing in 20 divisions, making it the nation's biggest football-only high school sports league. The football team is one of the 12 programs assigned to the two Ivy divisions starting in 2020, which are intended to allow weaker programs ineligible for playoff participation to compete primarily against each other. The school was classified by the NJSIAA as Group IV North for football for  2018–2020.

The boys' track team won the Group III state indoor relay championships in 1973.

In 1985, Coach Charles Wilkinson led the boys basketball team to face on Elizabeth High School in the state championship Group IV semifinal, falling by a score of 45-44 to end their season.

The 2021 boys' baseball team won the Hudson County Interscholastic Association League and won the Hudson County Tournament championship with a 5-4 win against Hudson Catholic Regional High School in the finals, ending the program's 69-year wait after most recently winning the title in 1952.

The Ferris Bulldogs football team are led by head coach Rich Glover Jr, the son of a former football player Rich Glover that has played as a defensive tackle for the New York Giants and Philadelphia Eagles of the NFL.

The James J. Ferris High School Bulldogs offers fall sports, winter sports, and spring sports such as

(Fall) -    
Football 
Soccer
Cross Country
Tennis
Girls Volleyball

(Winter) -
Basketball
Swimming 
Indoor Track
Bowling

(Spring) -
Baseball
Softball
Boys Volleyball

Notable alumni

 Robert Ashby (1926–2021, class of 1944), U.S. Army Air Force/U.S. Air Force officer and pilot with the all-African American 332nd Fighter Group – Tuskegee Airmen, who was the first Black pilot for Frontier Airlines.
 June Kirby (1928-2022), actress and model.
 Warren Loving (born 1960) running back who played in the NFL in 1987 for the Buffalo Bills.
 Tony Nicodemo (born 1935), college basketball player who set several records while playing for Saint Michael's College of Vermont in the late 1950s.
 Ralph Peduto (1942–2014), film, theater and television actor.
 Ray Radziszewski (born 1935), former professional basketball player who played in one game in 1958 for the Philadelphia Warriors.
 Michael Angelo Saltarelli (1932-2009), prelate of the Roman Catholic Church who served as Bishop of Wilmington from 1995 to 2008.
 Fearon Wright (born 1978), American football linebacker, who played in the National Football League for the Minnesota Vikings.

Administration
Core members of the school's administration are:
Deneen Alford, Principal
Shirley Delgado, Vice Principal
Emilio Pane, Vice Principal

References

External links 
James J. Ferris High School
Jersey City Public Schools

School Data for the Jersey City Public Schools, National Center for Education Statistics

High schools in Jersey City, New Jersey
Middle States Commission on Secondary Schools
Public high schools in Hudson County, New Jersey
Magnet schools in New Jersey